Starks may refer to:

Places
United States
Starks, Illinois
Starks, Louisiana
Starks, Maine
Starks, Wisconsin

Sports
Starks Park, football field Scotland

Other uses
Tony Stark, a byname for the Marvel comic book superhero Iron Man

See also
Starks (surname)
Stark (surname)
Stark (disambiguation)